The green manakin (Cryptopipo holochlora) is a species of bird in the family Pipridae. It occurs in humid forest in lowlands and foothills in the western Amazon Basin and adjacent east Andean foothills in southeastern Colombia, eastern Ecuador and eastern Peru. It is considered to be of least concern by BirdLife International and IUCN.

References

Cryptopipo
Birds of Colombia
Birds of Ecuador
Birds of the Peruvian Amazon
Birds described in 1888
Taxa named by Philip Sclater
Taxonomy articles created by Polbot